Yehuda Ha-Cohen Ibn Susan (also known as Yehuda Ha-Cohen;; 12th century) was a rabbi and dayan in the city of Fez, Morocco. According to some sources he was the rabbi of Maimonides. He was martyred around 1165.

Biography

Yehuda HaCohen ibn Susan was a dayan or Jewish religious jurisprudent in Fez, Morocco, then controlled by the Almohad Caliphate, and was known for his genius in Torah wisdom and hasidut. His ancestors came to Fez from Babylon. Saadia Ibn Danan writes that after the death of Joseph ibn Migash in 1141, the yeshivot in al-Andalus dwindled, and Maimon the Dayan, the father of Maimonides, heard about the greatness of ibn Susan and traveled to him from Córdoba with his two sons: Musa (Maimonides), and his brother David, and they studied with him for a period not exceeding five years.

Around 1165 he was required by the Almohads to convert to Islam, and when he refused, was martyred. According to ibn Danan, this event was the reason for the Maimonides' departure from Morocco.

Rabbi Saadia's descriptions correspond to another source in a manuscript attributed to a descendant of Maimonides' generation and are accepted by most historians. Nevertheless, some scholars doubt this.

References

External links
 Saadia Ibn Danan, Article on the Order of Generations (in Hebrew) HebrewBooks
 Maimonides entry in Jewish Encyclopedia
 Maimonides entry in the Encyclopædia Britannica
 Maimonides entry in the Encyclopaedia Judaica, 2nd edition
 Solomon Zeitlin, "MAIMONIDES", The American Jewish Year Book, Vol. 37, pp 65 - 66.

1165 deaths
Year of birth unknown
12th-century Moroccan people
12th-century rabbis
Medieval Moroccan rabbis
People from Fez, Morocco
Maimonides
Jewish martyrs